The Fencing competition in the 2009 Summer Universiade were held in Belgrade, Serbia.

Medal overview

Men's events

Women's events

Medal table

External links

2009 Summer Universiade
Universiade
Fencing at the Summer Universiade
Fencing competitions in Serbia